The Riyria Chronicles is a series of high fantasy novels by Michael J. Sullivan, published since 2013 by Orbit Books. The series consists of five books, in order of publication: The Crown Tower, The Rose and the Thorn, The Death of Dulgath, The Disappearance of Winter’s Daughter and Drumindor (not yet written). They are prequels to Sullivan's Riyria Revelations series.

Books
The series The Riyria Revelations and its prequels, The Riyria Chronicles, can be read in chronological order or order of publication. The author has recommended reading in publication order as listed below.

 The Crown Tower (August 2013), core novel #1
 The Viscount and the Witch (October 2011), short story
 The Rose and the Thorn (September 2013), core novel #2
 The Jester (January 2014), short story
 Professional Integrity (June 2015), short story
 The Death of Dulgath (October 2015), core novel #3
 The Disappearance of Winter's Daughter (September 2017), core novel #4
 Drumindor (not yet published), core novel #5

References

American fantasy novel series